Jake Helgren (born November 28, 1981, in Elgin, Texas) is an American film producer, director and screenwriter.

Selected filmography
 Christmas on the Menu (2020)
 Dashing in December (2020)
 Nightmare Nurse (2016)
 Finding Mr. Wright (2011)

References

External links
 
 

1981 births
Living people
People from Texas
American film producers
American film directors
American screenwriters